The 2014–15 FA Vase is the 41st season of the FA Vase, an annual football competition for teams playing below Step 4 of the English National League System.   The competition is to be played with two qualifying rounds preceding the six proper rounds, semi-finals (played over two legs) and final to be played at Wembley Stadium.

The 2015 winners were North Shields F.C., who beat Glossop North End A.F.C. 2–1 on 9 May at Wembley Stadium.

For the 2014–15 season 536 entrants were accepted, one more than the 2013–14 season.

Calendar
The calendar for the 2014–15 FA Vase qualifying rounds, as announced by The Football Association.

First round qualifying
First round qualifying fixtures were played on 6 September 2014, with replays taking place no later than 11 September 2014. Two-hundred and ninety teams entered at this stage of the competition. The draw was as follows:

Notes:
 † = After Extra Time

Second round qualifying
Second round qualifying fixtures were played on 4 October 2014, with replays taking place no later than 9 October 2014. One-hundred and seventy-seven new teams joined the one-hundred and forty-five who won their First round qualifying match at this stage of the competition. The draw was as follows:

Notes:
 † = After Extra Time

First round proper
First round proper fixtures were played on 1 November 2014, with replays taking place no later than 6 November 2014. Forty-three new teams joined the one-hundred and sixty-one who won their Second round qualifying match at this stage of the competition. Alnwick Town received a bye The draw was as follows:

Notes:
 † = After Extra Time

Second round proper
Second round proper fixtures were played on 22 November 2014, with replays taking place no later than 27 November 2014. Twenty-six new teams joined the one-hundred and two who won their First round match at this stage of the competition. The draw was as follows:

Notes:
 † = After Extra Time

Third round proper
Third round proper fixtures were played on 6 December 2014, with replays taking place no later than 11 December 2014.  No new teams were added for the remainder of the competition. The draw was as follows:

Notes:
 † = After Extra Time

Fourth round proper
Fourth round proper fixtures were played on 17 January 2015, with replays taking place no later than 22 January 2015. The draw was as follows:

Notes:
 † = After Extra Time

Fifth round proper
Fifth round proper fixtures were played on 7 February 2015, with replays taking place no later than 12 February 2015. The draw was as follows:

Notes:
 † = After Extra Time

Quarter-finals
Quarter-final fixtures were played on 28 February 2015, with replays taking place no later than 5 March 2015. The draw was as follows:

Notes:
 † = After Extra Time

Semi-finals
Semi-final fixtures were played on 21 & 28 March 2015. The draw was as follows:

North Shields won 3–0 on aggregate.

Glossop North End won 2–1 on aggregate.

Final

References

FA Vase seasons
FA Vase
FA Vase